Wolton may refer to:

 Wolton (surname), including a list of people with the name
 Wolton, Wyoming

See also 
 Woolton, a suburb of Liverpool, UK